The International Department of the Central Committee of the Chinese Communist Party (ID), better known as the International Liaison Department (ILD), is an agency under the Central Committee of the Chinese Communist Party in charge of establishing and maintaining relations with foreign political parties. In addition, it gathers intelligence on and influences foreign political parties, organizations, think tanks, and academics as well being tasked with finding ways to divide potential critics.

History 
The department was established in 1951, and was tasked with overseeing relations with foreign communist parties, especially the Communist Party of the Soviet Union and the socialist bloc. The ILD's mandate became more important following the Sino-Soviet split, as the party began more aggressively seeking supporters for its position among communist parties operating overseas. Afterwards it maintained ties between the CCP and the Maoist parties around the world, often attempting to foment revolution abroad by funneling money and resources to left-wing and rebel groups. From 1962 through the first half Cultural Revolution, foreign relations were mainly conducted by Kang Sheng on behalf of the Politburo Standing Committee.

In the 1980s under Deng Xiaoping, the ILD expanded its mission to include cultivating relations with non-communist parties, and shed its overtly revolutionary objectives. In this era, the department sought to forge ties with "any foreign political party that was willing to meet with it." With the end of the Cold War and collapse of the Soviet Union, the ILD's expanded mission of engaging with parties across the political spectrum became more important. Since the early 2000s, the ILD has increased its global outreach. According to scholar Anne-Marie Brady, the ILD is "tasked with gathering intelligence on foreign politicians and political parties, and developing asset relations with them."

List of directors
Directors of the ILD:
Wang Jiaxiang (1951 – March 1966)
Liu Ningyi (acting; June 1966 – April 1968)
Geng Biao (January 1971 – January 1979)
Ji Pengfei (January 1979 – April 1982)
Qiao Shi (April 1982 – July 1983)
Qian Liren (July 1983 – December 1985)
Zhu Liang (December 1985 – March 1993)
Li Shuzheng (March 1993 – August 1997)
Dai Bingguo (August 1997 – March 2003)
Wang Jiarui (March 2003 – November 2015)
Song Tao (November 2015 – June 2022)
Liu Jianchao (June 2022 – present)

See also 

 Chinese Association for International Understanding
 International Department of the Communist Party of the Soviet Union

References

External links 

 

Institutions of the Central Committee of the Chinese Communist Party
1951 establishments in China
Organizations established in 1951
Chinese intelligence agencies
Chinese propaganda organisations
Information operations units and formations
Disinformation operations